Peter Hunnigale, also known as Mr. Honey Vibes (born 12 December 1960, South London, England) is a British reggae singer best known for his lovers rock releases.

Biography
Hunnigale started his career as bass guitarist with the Vibes Corner Collective. In 1983, LGR Records issued his debut release as a singer, "Slipping Away", which was followed by "Got To Know You" on the Street Vibes label, a label that Hunnigale set up with Fitzroy Blake, who had also been a member of the Street Vibes 
Collective). He topped the UK reggae chart in 1987 with "Be My Lady", which was followed by his debut album, In This Time. A string of hits followed, and he enjoyed another UK reggae number one with "Ragamuffin Girl", a combination single recorded with Tippa Irie. The single was also voted Best British Reggae Record by Echoes newspaper at the end of the year. He won a Best Newcomer award at the Celebrity Awards in 1987, and won Best British Reggae Album at the British Reggae Industry Awards the same year. The success of the single led to further combination work with Irie, including two albums – The New Decade on Island Records and Done Cook and Currie for 
Rebel MC's Tribal Base label. The latter was produced by Hunnigale and he also played all the instruments on it. He also recorded in Jamaica, with producers such as Gussie Clarke. Hunnigale's second solo album, Mr. Vibes, followed in 1992. In 1993, he again linked up with Tippa irie for the "Shouting For The Gunners" single, a celebration of the football club that they both supported, Arsenal FC. 1994 saw Hunnigale moving in a more rootsy direction with Mr. Government, recorded with Neil "Mad Professor" Fraser. Hunnigale again linked with Irie in 1995 for a version of "Declaration of Rights" recorded for his Nah Give Up compilation. Nah Give Up won the Best Reggae Album MOBO Award in 1996, one of several awards Hunnigale won during the mid-1990s. He also recorded duets with Dennis Brown ("Cupid"), Lloyd Brown ("Lonely Girl"), and Janet Lee Davis ("We Can Work It Out"). In 1996, Hunnigale performed at Jamaica's Reggae Sunsplash festival. Towards the end of 1996, Hunnigale performed as part of Passion, along with Glamma Kid and Nerious Joseph, spending eight weeks at number one in the UK reggae chart with "No Diggity".

Hunnigale also performed in the reggae musical, Johnny Dollar.

Discography

Albums
In This Time (1987) Level Vibes (Peter Hunnigale & The Night Flight Band)
The New Decade (1991) Mango (with Tippa Irie)
Mr. Vibes (1992) Street Vibes
Done Cook and Currie (1992) Tribal Base
The Pacifists Sony
Mr. Government (1994) Ariwa
Silly Habits (1997) Down to Jam
Genuine Saxon
Back to the Old Skool vol. 1 (1998) Discotex
Can't Stop (2002) Charm
African Tears (2001) Charm
Toe 2 Toe Vol VIII Jet Star
Rhythm & Song (2006) Cousins
Free Soul (2008) Peckings
Pizza and Alcohol (2019), Jet Star

Compilations
Nah Give Up (1995) Kalymazoo/Down to Jam
Reggae Max (1996) Jet Star
Reggae Max Part 2 (2006) Jet Star

References

External links
Peter Hunnigale on Myspace
Peter Hunnigale at reggae-reviews.com
Dalton, Peter "AFRICAN TEARS – PETER HUNNIGALE" (review), reggaezine
"MNP Interviews: Peter Hunnigale", MusicMNP

1960 births
Living people
British reggae musicians
20th-century Black British male singers
21st-century Black British male singers